NEON STRUCT: Die Augen der Welt is a first-person perspective stealth game developed and published by Minor Key Games for the PC Windows, macOS, and Linux/SteamOS in 2015.

Gameplay

Plot

Development and release

Reception
The game received mixed reviews for an averaged Metacritic score of 63/100. GameSpot's Justin Clark described it as "a Super FX chip version of Deus Ex" that "is a testament to the skill involved, but it simply can’t help but suffer under the weight of its own ambitions." According to James Cunningham of Hardcore Gamer, Neon Struct "isn’t a perfect game, and technically its main gameplay focus of stealth is fairly simplistic," but it "makes up for this by being excellent in many other ways, most notably in the level design and world building." Simon Parkin of Eurogamer lauded this it as a game that "creeps into politically charged themes of surveillance with grace and style" for its "brooding" storyline that makes it "the best kind of science fiction thriller: one dressed in the style of the future, but engaged with the pressing issues of the present."

References

External links

2015 video games
Cyberpunk video games
Indie video games
Linux games
MacOS games
Spy video games
Stealth video games
Single-player video games
Video games developed in the United States
Video games featuring female protagonists
Video games set in the future
Windows games
Video games with Steam Workshop support